Bishop Davidson is an American politician and businessman serving as a member of the Missouri House of Representatives from the 130th district. Elected in November 2020, he assumed office on January 6, 2021.

Early life and education 
Davidson was born in Chesapeake, Virginia and graduated from Republic High School in Republic, Missouri. He earned a Bachelor of Arts degree in history and classics from the University of Missouri in 2016.

Career 
As an undergraduate, Davidson interned for the Heritage Foundation. From 2017 to 2019, he was a regional director for the Intercollegiate Studies Institute. In 2019, he founded Pelion Learning LLC, an education and tutoring service. Davidson was elected to the Missouri House of Representatives in November 2020 and assumed office on January 6, 2021.

Electoral History

State Representative

References 

Living people
People from Republic, Missouri
University of Missouri alumni
Republican Party members of the Missouri House of Representatives
Year of birth missing (living people)